The Morning Star is a novel by the Norwegian author Karl Ove Knausgård, published in 2020. 

The novel is the story of a number of people's everyday life in Sørlandet and Vestlandet while an extraordinarily bright and large star suddenly appears in the sky. It was Knausgård's first major novel after his autobiographical My Struggle series. Knausgård said that a main idea of the novel was to depict how reality and the same events is perceived differently by different people. The Norwegian publisher described it as "a novel about what we do not understand, about great drama seen through the limited lens of little lives. But first and foremost, it is a novel about what happens when the dark forces in the world are set free."

Morgenstjernen was published 18 September 2020 in Norway, in November 2020 in Denmark and in early 2021 in Sweden (as Morgonstjärnan) to great critical acclaim in all countries.
 It was nominated to the Norwegian Bokhandlerprisen in 2020. The novel was sold in advance to fifteen countries. An English translation with the title The Morning Star was published by Penguin Random House in September 2021.

References

2020 novels
Novels by Karl Ove Knausgård
Novels set in Norway
Forlaget Oktober books
21st-century Norwegian novels